Roman Ambrožič (born 14 September 1973) is a Slovenian rowing coxswain. He competed in the men's coxed pair event at the 1988 Summer Olympics.

References

1973 births
Living people
Slovenian male rowers
Olympic rowers of Yugoslavia
Rowers at the 1988 Summer Olympics
People from Bled
Coxswains (rowing)
20th-century Slovenian people